The Idaho Supreme Court is the state supreme court of Idaho and is composed of the chief justice and four associate justices.

The decisions of the Idaho Supreme Court are binding on all other Idaho state courts. The only court that may reverse or modify its decisions is the Supreme Court of the United States.

Justices

Justices are elected in non-partisan statewide elections and serve staggered six-year terms. Elections are held in the state primary, now in the spring, with run-off elections in November. The Chief Justice is selected by an election among the five justices and term length for that office is four years. Prior to 1983, the position went to the justice with the least amount of time remaining in his term.

The court originally had three justices; it was expanded to five in 1921.

Current justices

Women on the Supreme Court
The first female justice on the Idaho Supreme Court was Linda Copple Trout, appointed in 1992 by Governor Cecil Andrus and elected in 1996 and 2002. She remains as the state's only female chief justice (1997–2004). The second female justice was Cathy Silak, appointed by Andrus in 1993 and elected in 1994. She lost her reelection bid in 2000 to Dan Eismann and became the first incumbent justice from the court to be defeated since 1944.

After Trout's retirement in 2007, no women were on the court until the election of Robyn Brody in 2016 to a vacant seat, the first by a female; she is the only justice on the current court not first appointed. Colleen Zahn joined the court in 2021, appointed by Governor Brad Little; Brody and Zahn ran unopposed in 2022.

List of chief justices

 Election by peers began in 1983.

Video coverage
The Idaho Supreme Court first permitted live video and audio coverage from its chambers in late 1978.

See also
Courts of Idaho

References

External links 
 Idaho State Judiciary
 Boise Architecture.org - Idaho Supreme Court building

State supreme courts of the United States
Idaho state courts
1863 establishments in Idaho Territory
Courts and tribunals established in 1863